Santa Rita de Cássia (once called Rio Preto and Ibipetuba) is a Brazilian municipality in the state of Bahia. In 2020 the town's population was estimated as 28,481 inhabitants.

History
In mid 17th century, a Portuguese couple traveled to the city of Ibipetuba, and when they left the city they forgot a Santa Rita de Cássia's image inside of the plain house where they had lodged. The new colonists, who established in that place, founded a farm called ""Ribeira do Rio Preto"", along the margins of Preto river, later on, its name was changed to Santa Rita Farm, due to the image that was found, and a chapel was built in honor to that saint. As the settlement grew rapidly, it became primitive village of Santa Rita do Rio Preto, attaining a Parish City Hall, with the creation of Santa Rita de Cássia's parish, in 1804. In 1931, its name was changed to Rio Preto, and later on, in 1943, Ibipetuba, that means ""sand-bank"". In 1957, its name was changed to Santa Rita de Cássia.

Economy
Agriculture (6th watermelon producer and 36th of cassava). According to JUCEB's registers, it has 24 industries, occupying the 117th place in units throughout the State of Bahia, and has 535 commercial businesses, retaining the 30th position. Its hotel park records 90 beds. The residential electricity use amounts to 78,45 kwh/hab - 122nd in ranking within the State.

References

Municipalities in Bahia